Jesse M. Bethel High School is a high school located in Vallejo, California. It is part of the Vallejo City Unified School District. The school opened in the Fall of 1998, with only two student body classes. It is located on 1800 Ascot Pkwy and serves the east side of Vallejo (to the right of Interstate 80).

History
On May 14, 2015, Max Rusk, a student at the school, 17, was shot dead outside the school during late morning hours while on a trail. He was shot during a robbery which resulted in two non-student suspects arrested. The two were sentenced in 2021 to manslaughter.

References

External links
Official school website

Educational institutions established in 1998
High schools in Solano County, California
Public high schools in California
1998 establishments in California
Schools in Vallejo, California